Charles D. Hill (October 23, 1873 – January 1, 1926) was an American architect practicing in Dallas, Texas during the first three decades of the twentieth century.

Life and career
Charles Dexter Hill was born October 23, 1873, in Edwardsville, Illinois. He attended Valparaiso University from 1894 to 1895 before returning to Edwardsville. He worked as a draftsman for architects Charles Pauly of Edwardsville and Frederick C. Bonsack FAIA of St. Louis. For a few years he also operated a small practice of his own in Edwardsville, and briefly formed a partnership with Theodore C. Kistner in Granite City. Hill came to Texas in 1903, joining the office of Sanguinet & Staats in Fort Worth. In 1905 he was sent to Dallas to manage a new branch office. He became a partner in 1906, with the Dallas office now known as Sanguinet, Staats & Hill. In 1907 Hill bought the Dallas office outright, renaming it C. D. Hill & Company. The new firm quickly gained a statewide reputation, and a second office in Houston was established in 1908. In 1914 a third was added at Galveston, under the management of H. F. Davis, though this appears to have been discontinued after a few years.

His partners in C. D. Hill & Company were Douglas F. Coburn and Herschell D. Smith. The partnership was active until Hill's death in early 1926, when it was succeeded by Coburn, Smith & Evans (1926–1927), Coburn & Smith (1927–1928), Coburn & Fowler (1928 – c. 1931) and D. F. Coburn. The firm operated under Douglas F. Coburn until 1939, when he relocated to Shreveport, Louisiana, where he worked with the noted firm of Edward F. Neild until his retirement in 1955.

Personal life
Hill joined the American Institute of Architects in 1917.

Hill was married twice and had three children. He died January 2, 1926, in Dallas at the age of 52.

Legacy
Most of Hill's larger works are neoclassical buildings reflecting the Beaux-Arts movement. He also worked in other popular revival styles, including Colonial Revival and Gothic Revival, usually for residences and churches, respectively. Other projects, including the city halls of Galveston and Woodward, Oklahoma exhibit elements of Renaissance Revival architecture.

At least ten buildings designed by Hill and his partners have been listed on the United States National Register of Historic Places, and others contribute to listed historic districts..

The noted architect Joseph Finger was an employee in the firm's Houston office from 1908 to 1913.

Architectural works

References

Architects from Illinois
Architects from Texas
1873 births
1926 deaths
People from Edwardsville, Illinois
People from Dallas